All You Need Is the Music is a 1978 in-studio album containing the works of the American pop-singer Neil Sedaka. It was released in the US on Elektra Records, his second album for the company. Outside the United States it was released on the European-based Polydor label. It was conducted and arranged by Artie Butler and engineered by Ron Malo.

Track listing

Side One
 "All You Need Is the Music"
 "Candy Kisses"
 "Should've Never Let Her Go"
 "Sad, Sad Story"
 "Tillie The Twirler"

Side Two
 "Love Keeps Getting Stronger Every Day"
 "Born to Be Bad"
 "What a Surprise"
 "You Can Hear the Love"
 "City Boy"

Singles
The title track, "All You Need Is the Music" (a disco number that marked Sedaka reuniting with Howard Greenfield for the first time in several years), was released as a single, but it did not chart, nor did the follow-up "Sad, Sad Story" (b/w "Love Keeps Getting Stronger Every Day" in the UK and "Tillie the Twirler" in the US).

Reissue
In November 2022, the album was officially reissued on CD and digital platforms.

Trivia
Two years later, Sedaka would rework "Should've Never Let Her Go" into a duet with his daughter Dara under the title "Should've Never Let You Go" for the 1980 album In The Pocket; this duet version would be much more warmly received than the original version heard on this album.

References

Neil Sedaka albums
1978 albums
Elektra Records albums